Angelica Garcia may refer to:

 Angelica (singer) (born Angelica Garcia, in 1972), American former Latin pop singer
 Angelica Garcia (singer), American singer-songwriter
 Angélica García Arrieta, Mexican politician